Dennis Reeves (born 1 December 1944) is a Scottish former footballer who played as a goalkeeper.

Playing career
Although born in Scotland, Reeves was to spend his playing career in England and Wales. He was first invited to trials at Chester in 1961, going on to make his debut in The Football League for the club against Rochdale in October 1963. He went on to become a regular in the side for the next three years, a spell that included making a superb one handed save from Bobby Charlton in an FA Cup tie against Manchester United at Old Trafford.

After losing his place to Terry Carling during 1966–67, Reeves asked for a transfer and in October 1967 he moved to neighbours Wrexham. But just 15 league appearances followed and he dropped into Non-League football with Wigan Athletic in 1969. Reeves felt he produced the best form of his career at Springfield Park, with his time at the club including playing at Wembley Stadium against Scarborough in the 1973 final of the FA Trophy. He went on to make a total of 233 appearances for the club in the Northern Premier League.

Reeves left Wigan at the end of the 1975–76 season, working as a painter and decorator.

References

1944 births
Living people
Footballers from Dumfries and Galloway
English Football League players
Association football goalkeepers
Scottish footballers
Chester City F.C. players
Wrexham A.F.C. players
Wigan Athletic F.C. players